Rajmond Breznik was a Hungarian football player and coach.

He played in the Hungarian championship with Újpest FC in the season 1913–14 and with Budapesti TC in 1918–19. He also played in Yugoslavia with Juda Makabi Novi Sad, and since summer 1924 with NTK Novi Sad.

He later worked as coach with Yugoslav clubs HNK Cibalia and FK Bačka Mol.

References

Hungarian footballers
Association football midfielders
Újpest FC players
Budapesti TC players
Nemzeti Bajnokság I players
Expatriate footballers in Yugoslavia
Hungarian football managers
HNK Cibalia managers
Expatriate football managers in Yugoslavia
Year of birth missing